Connie is a given name. It may also refer to:

 Hurricane Connie (disambiguation), various hurricanes and cyclones, a typhoon and a tropical storm
 Connie Glacier, Wyoming, United States
 Stenodus nelma, a species of whitefish whose common names include the connie
 Connie (TV series), a 1985 British drama series starring Stephanie Beacham
 Connie (comic strip), an American adventure comic strip (1927-1944)
 nickname of the Lockheed Constellation, a mid-20th century propeller-driven airliner
 nickname of the aircraft carrier 
 nickname of the Vox Continental electronic organ

See also
 Koni (disambiguation)
 Konni (disambiguation)